Max Albert Hugo Eberlein (4 May 1887 – 16 October 1941) was a German Communist politician. He took part of the founding congress of the Communist Party of Germany ("KPD") in December 1918 and January 1919), and then in the First Congress of the Comintern (2–6 March 1919), where he held important posts until 1928, the result of his involvement with the Conciliator faction. When the Nazis took power in Germany in 1933, Eberlein fled to the Soviet Union, where he found refuge at the Hotel Lux.

In July 1937 he fell under the Great Purge. In January 1938 he was interrogated and tortured for ten days and nights. In April 1938 he was taken to Lefortovo Prison, where he was tortured for weeks at a time; then in 1939 he was sentenced to 15 years in the Vorkuta Gulag. He was returned to Moscow in 1941, when he was tried and sentenced again, and was shot on 16 October 1941. Hugo Eberlein was later rehabilitated and became a national hero in East Germany; his name was even borne by a guard regiment of the National People's Army.

Years in Germany 
Eberlein, a trained technical draftsman, joined the SPD in 1906, where he belonged to the left wing. As an opponent of the party's policy of support for the war and cessation of strikes during the First World War, he co-founded the USPD and the Spartacus League. At the end of 1918 he was a founding member of the KPD and was elected to its leadership, to which he belonged until 1929. 

He represented the party executive of the KPD in the place of the murdered Rosa Luxemburg at the founding congress of the Communist International (Comintern) in early March 1919, where he abstained from voting on its founding - as previously recommended by Luxemburg and Leo Jogiches - because he believed that it was premature. Nevertheless, once the Comintern had been established, he pleaded successfully for the KPD to join after his return to Germany and acted as a confidante for the Comintern leadership in Germany for the next few years. He was among other things responsible for receiving financial support payments addressed to the KPD.

In May 1919 he was managing director of the newspaper Die Rote Fahne, the central organ of the KPD. In the KPD in the 1920s, Eberlein, who was also a member of the Prussian state parliament from 1921 to 1933, initially supported the party leadership around Heinrich Brandler and August Thalheimer, then belonged to the so-called middle group, and from 1927 was part of the conciliators, who were driven out of the KPD's leadership in 1929 after the Wittorf affair and the return of Ernst Thälmann to power at the direction of Joseph Stalin. From that point he was employed, like Arthur Ewert and Kurt Sauerland, under the leadership of Béla Kun in the apparatus of the Comintern.

Exile and death 
After being briefly imprisoned after the National Socialists seized power in 1933, Eberlein was able to go into exile in France, where he campaigned for the establishment of a popular front between communists, social democrats and bourgeois forces. After being arrested in Strasbourg in 1935 and temporarily imprisoned, he emigrated to the Soviet Union in 1936 after a stopover in Switzerland. 

Despite the intercession of his friend Wilhelm Pieck, Eberlein was swept up in the Great Terror and was imprisoned in July 1937. On May 5, 1939, at a closed session of the Military Collegium of the USSR Supreme Court, he was sentenced to 15 years in the gulag for allegedly being involved in a "terrorist organization" within the Comintern apparatus as part of the "anti-Comintern bloc". On June 1, 1939 he was transported to Vorkuta. According to other sources, he was imprisoned in the Unzhlag camp near Sukhobezvodnoye in 1939/1941.

In 1941 he was transferred to a camp 100 km north of Syktyvkar in the Komi Autonomous Soviet Socialist Republic. From here he was transported back to Moscow and charged again. On July 30, 1941 he was sentenced to death by firing squad, which was carried out on October 16, 1941. His brother was also shot. 

Eberlein was later rehabilitated and became a national hero in East Germany; his name was even borne by a guard regiment of the National People's Army.

Personal life 
Hugo Eberlein was married twice. On April 3, 1913 he married Luise Auguste Anna Harms (July 15, 1889 – January 11, 1964) in Berlin-Charlottenburg. From this marriage came his son Werner Eberlein, who made a career as an SED official. In his second marriage he was married to Inna Armand, a daughter of the French-born Russian Bolshevik Inessa Armand; their daughter Ines came from this marriage. Hugo Eberlein is also commemorated on the tombstone of his son Werner in the graves for victims of fascism and those persecuted by the Nazi regime in Berlin's Friedrichsfelde Central Cemetery.

References

External links 
 Founding congress of the KPD (Spartakus) December 31, 1918
 

1887 births
1944 deaths
People from Saalfeld
Social Democratic Party of Germany politicians
Independent Social Democratic Party politicians
Communist Party of Germany politicians
German Comintern people
Soviet rehabilitations
Great Purge victims from Germany
Executed people from Thuringia
German emigrants to the Soviet Union